Kuvshinovo is a town and the administrative center of Kuvshinovsky District in Tver Oblast, Russia, located on the Osuga,  from Tver, the administrative center of the oblast. Population:

History
The selo of Kamenka, the predecessor of Kuvshinovo, was first mentioned in 1646. In the course of the administrative reform carried out in 1708 by Peter the Great, it was included into Ingermanlandia Governorate (since 1710 known as Saint Petersburg Governorate), and in 1727 Novgorod Governorate split off. In 1775, Tver Viceroyalty was formed from the lands which previously belonged to Moscow and Novgorod Governorates, and the area was transferred to Tver Viceroyalty, which in 1796 was transformed to Tver Governorate. Kamenka belonged to Novotorzhsky Uyezd (with the center in Torzhok).

In the 18th century, a paper mill was opened close to Kamenka. In 1869, merchant Mikhail Kuvshinov bought the mill and considerably expanded it. The mill became known as the Kuvshinov Paper Mill. In 1912, a railway from Torzhok was completed, and the new station next to Kamenka was opened. The station was named Kuvshinovo, after the mill. Eventually, a settlement around the station developed, also with the name Kuvshinovo.

On 1 October 1929, governorates and uyezds were abolished, and Kamensky District with the administrative center in Kuvshinovo was established. It belonged to Rzhev Okrug of Western Oblast. On August 1, 1930 the okrugs were abolished, and the districts were subordinated directly to the oblast. On January 29, 1935 Kalinin Oblast was established, and Kamensky District was transferred to Kalinin Oblast. In 1938, the selo of Kamenka and the settlement of Kuvshinovo were merged into the town of Kuvshinovo. In February 1963, during the abortive administrative reform by Nikita Khrushchev, Novotorzhsky, Likhoslavlsky, and Kamensky Districts were merged into a new district which was called Torzhoksky District. On January 12, 1965 Kuvshinovsky District (which occupied the same area as the former Kamensky District) was re-established. In 1990, Kalinin Oblast was renamed Tver Oblast.

Administrative and municipal status
Within the framework of administrative divisions, Kuvshinovo serves as the administrative center of Kuvshinovsky District. As an administrative division, it is incorporated within Kuvshinovsky District as Kuvshinovo Urban Settlement. As a municipal division, this administrative unit also has urban settlement status and is a part of Kuvshinovsky Municipal District.

Economy

Industry
The main industry branch in Kuvshinovo is paper production. The Kuvshinovo Paper Mill (built in the 19th century by merchant Kuvshinov, hence the name) was producing paper until the 1990s, and then the local timber production stopped, and the mill had to switch to cardboard production.

Transportation

A railway line which connects Likhoslavl with Soblago via Torzhok and Selizharovo passes Kuvshinovo. It is served by infrequent passenger traffic.

A road connecting Torshok with Ostashkov runs through Kuvshinovo. Another road connects Kuvshinovo with Vyshny Volochyok via Yesenovichi. There are local roads as well, with the bus traffic originating from Kuvshinovo.

Culture and recreation
Kuvshinovo has three objects classified as cultural and historical heritage of local significance. All of them are the remains of the former Kuvshinov Estate. The town has a local museum as well.

References

Notes

Sources



Cities and towns in Tver Oblast
Novotorzhsky Uyezd
Monotowns in Russia